Marlou van der Kulk (born 9 September 1993) is a Dutch Paralympic swimmer. She competed in the 2012 Summer Paralympics in London, winning two bronze medals. Van der Kulk has also competed in two IPC Swimming World Championships winning four gold medals.

Career history
Van der Kulk was born on the 9 September 1993 in Huizen, Netherlands. She started swimming at the age of 12, and began competitive swimming while still in high school. Classified as an S14 swimmer, for athletes with an intellectual impairment, she was part of the Netherlands team chosen to compete on home soil at Eindhoven for the 2010 IPC Swimming World Championships. Entered in her favoured 100m backstroke and 200m freestyle, she took both events making her a double gold medal world champion at the age of 16. 

Two years later van der Kulk was back representing the Netherlands, this time in London for the 2012 Summer Paralympics. In her first event, the 100m backstroke, she posted a time of 1:09.98, coming in second to Britain's Chloe Davies, but her time was good enough for her to qualify for the final. In the final later that evening she swam an improved time of 1:09.50 just 4 hundredths of a second behind second placed Taylor Corry, to give van der Kulk the bronze, her first Paralympic medal. Two days later in the 200m freestyle she won her heat with a time of 2:14.43. In the final van der Kulk swam slightly slower with a time of 2:14.80, but it was enough to push Australia's Kayla Clarke into fourth place to give van der Kulk her second Paralympic bronze. Her final event was the 100m breaststroke. By winning the first heat in the inaugural SB14 100m backstroke, van der Kulk, by default, set a new Paralympic record. This record was short-lived being taken from her moments later in the second heat by teammate Magda Toeters. In the final, van der Kulk came sixth.

In her second World Championships, in 2013 in Montreal she entered four events. She took two medals, both gold. She retained her 100m backstroke title won in Eindhoven and also won the 200m medley, but she could only manage a fourth in the 200m freestyle.

References 

1993 births
Living people
Dutch female backstroke swimmers
Dutch female breaststroke swimmers
Dutch female freestyle swimmers
Paralympic swimmers of the Netherlands
Swimmers at the 2012 Summer Paralympics
Paralympic bronze medalists for the Netherlands
People from Huizen
Medalists at the 2012 Summer Paralympics
S14-classified Paralympic swimmers
Medalists at the World Para Swimming Championships
Medalists at the World Para Swimming European Championships
Paralympic medalists in swimming
Sportspeople from North Holland
21st-century Dutch women